The Florida Municipal Electric Association (FMEA) is the non-profit trade association representing the unified interests of Florida’s 33 public power communities. FMEA provides its members with government relations, mutual aid coordination, communications, education, and networking opportunities. The association supports its member utilities by promoting public power and delivering superior services through advocacy, mutual aid, education, and collaboration.

Based in Tallahassee, FMEA was established in 1942 in response to WWII fuel shortages and is now the statewide trade association and voice for Florida’s 33 municipal electric utilities, serving more than three million residential and business customers in the state and employing more than 5,000 Floridians.

FMEA’s membership categories, along with the 33 municipal electric utility members, also include associate member companies, affiliates, and public agencies. FMEA is governed by its board of directors and its members.

Member Utilities

 Alachua
 Bartow
 Beaches Energy Services
 Blountstown
 Bushnell
 Clewiston
 Chattahoochee
 Fort Meade
 Fort Pierce Utilities Authority
 Gainesville Regional Utilities
 Green Cove Springs
 Havana
 Homestead Energy Services
 JEA
 Key West
 Kissimmee Utility Authority
 Lake Worth Beach
 Lakeland Electric
 Leesburg
 Moore Haven
 Mount Dora
 New Smyrna Beach
 Newberry
 Ocala
 Orlando Utilities Commission
 Quincy
 Starke
 Tallahassee
 Wauchula
 Williston
 Winter Park

Affiliate Members

 St. Cloud
 Reedy Creek

Affiliated Organizations

Florida Municipal Power Agency
American Public Power Association
The Energy Authority
Hometown Connections
The Florida League of Cities
Florida Municipal Broadband Alliance

Member Services

Government Relations: FMEA has a broad legislative team actively representing public power’s interests on a wide variety of state and federal legislative and regulatory issues.

Mutual Aid Coordination: FMEA serves as the mutual aid coordinator for our member utilities, arranging assistance from other utilities to provide help following a storm, hurricane or other emergency situation. FMEA also serves as the statewide mutual aid coordinator as part of the American Public Power Association mutual aid process.

Information Clearinghouse: FMEA functions as an information clearinghouse for industry news and trends, providing access to a comprehensive news archive, electric industry statistics, legislative and regulatory updates,  and technical information for individual utility members.

Industry News: Through a weekly Headline News email, FMEA provides industry related news articles. Although the news concentrates on Florida’s electric and energy industry, pertinent national stories are also run featuring governmental and regulatory news, technical and utility operations news, and environmental impact news.

Relay Magazine: FMEA’s quarterly Relay magazine provides a close-up look at Florida’s public power utilities highlighting their communities, employees, projects, and events. Relay is Florida’s only electric utility industry magazine and has a readership of more than 1,500.

Florida Electric Bill Comparison: FMEA conducts a monthly comparison of electric bills for Florida’s municipal and investor-owned electric utilities.. . The monthly report provides a fair comparison of customer bills served by different utilities. The report includes utility rates, average franchise fees of 6 percent, and local payments in lieu of taxes

Lineman Assistance Fund: The FMEA Lineman Assistance Fund provides FMEA member utilities’ lineworkers with emergency financial assistance as they deal with medical conditions. The Fund assists linemen and their families when an on-the-job injury creates a special need.

Professional Network: Through member surveys, roundtables, conferences, and other events, FMEA provides opportunities for its members to network with each other, sharing information, best practices and lessons learned.

FMEA also produces a monthly bill comparison report that includes information from Florida’s municipal and investor-owned utilities. It compares utility bills for residential, commercial and industrial electric customers categorized by consumption in 15 categories. This information is available to the public on its website.

Events

FMEA offers many conferences, roundtables, workshops, and training programs for member utilities. FMEA hosts five signature events throughout the year:

The FMEA Annual Conference, which brings top industry speakers, informative workshops and discussion groups together for utility managers and CEOs, city managers and directors, local policymakers and elected officials from public power municipalities, and other electric utilities.

The Energy Connections Conference & Trade Show, a two-day event on how to improve their day-to-day business operations, focusing on customer service, safety, utility operations, cybersecurity and technology, and more.

The Florida Lineman Competition, an annual day-long event that pits utility lineman teams from all over the state against one another in competitions demonstrating their skills, knowledge and teamwork.

The FMEA Hurricane Forum, a one-day educational event focusing on hurricane preparedness and response, mutual aid, FEMA issues, and other disaster and emergency response related  topics.

The FMEA Legislative Rally, a convening of FMEA members in Tallahassee during Florida’s annual legislative session to discuss legislative proposals affecting public power communities and to advocate these critical issues before the legislature.

Electric power in the United States
Trade associations based in the United States
Organizations based in Tallahassee, Florida